The Norfolk Record Office holds the archives for the County of Norfolk. The archives are held at Martineau Lane, Norwich, and run by Norfolk County Council. The Record Office also hosts the East Anglian Film Archive.

References

Norwich
Archives in Norfolk
History of Norfolk
County record offices in England